Selfo is a class of abstract strategy board games subscribed to the category of connection games. It was designed by Prof. Francisco Vico and its name derives from the phenomenon of self-organization (increase in a system's organization without external guidance), since during the game the sets of pieces might flow in a coordinated way as they step on the board.

Description
Despite its very simple definition (“group your set of pieces by moving in turns to adjacent cells”) complex self-organization processes take place during the game under concrete circumstances (a balanced distribution of pieces and players with a similar level of expertise), and is the result of abrupt and deep changes in the tactics. The particular values given to the traditional parameters that define a game (i.e. board tiling, size and initial position, or number of pieces and players) are not so relevant, and many variants have been found to meet the conditions for self-organization. The Selfo class of connection game is defined, instead, by the interrelations among parameters in order to favor self-organization. Subclasses of Selfo derive upon the move length (number of movements of a piece in a single turn to adjacent empty cells). In a generic Selfo-n game, a player can move one piece from 0 (passing on the turn) to n consecutive steps.

An algorithm has been designed to play Selfo at a human level, and an implementation of it is publicly accessible.

References

Board games
Abstract strategy games
Connection games